Hoipolloi was a British touring theatre company committed to creating new work for theatre that imaginatively engages their audience and makes them laugh. Their work includes ensemble shows such as The Doubtful Guest and My Uncle Arly, and collaborations with fictional Welsh artist "Hugh Hughes", including the shows Floating and Story of a Rabbit.

History 

The company was founded in 1994 by Shôn Dale-Jones (now Artistic Director) and Stefanie Müller (Associate Director).  Dale-Jones and Müller met at the International Theatre School Jacques Lecoq, and initially worked with other performers they had met at the school.  The Lecoq approach to theatre was a large influence on the company’s work. Since 1994, Hoipolloi have created and toured 18 new shows. The company was wound down in 2020 after 26 years.

Productions 

All Hoipolloi productions were devised by the company's core artistic team, led by Artistic Director Shôn Dale-Jones, including input from the performers, with improvisation playing a large role in the creation of each show. Hoipolloi shows are often highly theatrical and humorous.  Shôn Dale-Jones’ interest in nonsense literature is reflected in Hoipolloi’s last two ensemble shows, The Doubtful Guest, inspired by the book of the same name by Edward Gorey, and My Uncle Arly, which was inspired by the work of Edward Lear .

Past Hoipolloi productions
 The Wonderful World of Hugh Hughes (2010 onwards)
 Hugh Hughes in... 360 (2009 onwards)
 The Doubtful Guest (2008 - 2009)
 Story of a Rabbit (2007 onwards)
 The Impostor (2006)
 Floating (2005 onwards)
 Ablaze! (2004)
 The Man Next Door (2003)
 My Uncle Arly (2002-2005, 2009)
 Marry Maria (2002)
 Sweet Bobabola (2000–2003)
 Living Like Victor (1999–2000)
 Dead on the Ground (1997)
 Backwash (1996)
 Honestly (1995–1999)
 The Breeze (1995)
 Amok (1994)
 The Naked King of the Morning (1994)

Hugh Hughes 

Since 2005, Hoipolloi have purported to have collaborated with the fictional Welsh artist Hugh Hughes, whose shows Floating, Story of a Rabbit and Hugh Hughes in... 360 have brought Hoipolloi success, each winning an award at the Edinburgh Festival Fringe: Floating won a Total Theatre Award in 2006, Story of a Rabbit was awarded a Fringe First in 2007 and 360 received a Three Weeks Editors' Award in 2009.

Hughes’ theatrical style is unusual, often involving flip-charts and power-point presentations, and sometimes resembling a lecture more than a play. In 2010, the Barbican Centre commissioned Hugh and Hoipolloi to turn all three shows into a residency called The Wonderful World of Hugh Hughes.

In September 2011, BBC Radio 4 broadcast Floating as an afternoon play.

References

External links 
 Hoipolloi website 
 Hugh Hughes page on Facebook
 Hugh Hughes on Twitter
 Hoipolloi on Twitter 

Theatre companies in England
Companies based in Cambridge
Physical theatre